"Stjärnorna", written by Lena Philipsson and Torgny Söderberg, is a song performed by Lena Philipsson on her 1995 album Lena Philipsson. The song also appeared as film music for the 1995 film En på miljonen.

Single
The single peaked at 29th position at the Swedish singles chart.

The song was also tested for Svensktoppen, where it stayed for 10 weeks between 7 October-9 December, peaking at 2nd position.

Other recordings
With lyrics in Finnish, as Tähtien katse, Arja Koriseva recorded the song in 1995.

Charts

References

1995 singles
1995 songs
Lena Philipsson songs
Songs written by Torgny Söderberg
Swedish-language songs